Dehnow (also Romanized as Deh-i-Nau) is a village in Akhand Rural District, Central District, Asaluyeh County, Bushehr Province, Iran. At the 2006 census, its population was 596, in 90 families.

References 

Populated places in Asaluyeh County